Kim Jung-mo (born 1 June 1974) is a South Korean cyclist. He competed in the men's team pursuit at the 1996 Summer Olympics.

References

1974 births
Living people
South Korean male cyclists
Olympic cyclists of South Korea
Cyclists at the 1996 Summer Olympics
Place of birth missing (living people)